Ahmet Kuru (born 23 April 1982) is a Turkish former professional footballer who played as a striker.

After coming through Werder Bremen's youth system, he played for the club's reserves, Eintracht Braunschweig, and FC St. Pauli. He went on to spend the rest of his career in Turkey.

References

External links
 

1982 births
Living people
People from Rotenburg an der Wümme
German people of Turkish descent
Footballers from Lower Saxony
Turkish footballers
Association football forwards
Rotenburger SV players
FC St. Pauli players
Eintracht Braunschweig players
SV Werder Bremen II players
Antalyaspor footballers
2. Bundesliga players
Regionalliga players
Süper Lig players
TFF First League players
TFF Second League players